John Keefe (born October 29, 1979) is an American film and television actor, best known for playing Julian Garrison in Return of the Living Dead: Necropolis and its following sequel, Return of the Living Dead: Rave to the Grave.

He was also the chief visual effects machinist for The Aviator.

Filmography
2004 The Practice (TV series, episode: "In Good Conscience") ... Tom Quillen
2005 Proof ... University Friend
2005 The Inside (TV series, episode: "New Girl in Town") ... Eric
2005 Return of the Living Dead: Necropolis ... Julian Garrison
2005 Return of the Living Dead: Rave to the Grave ... Julian Garrison
2007 Not Another High School Show (TV movie)  ... Brian Atkins
2007 White Air ... Brad Crow
2013 Here We Go

References

External links

1979 births
American male film actors
American male television actors
Living people
Male actors from Boston